This is a list of VTV dramas released in 2014. All times are in UTC+7.

←2013 - 2014 - 2015→

VTV Special Tet dramas
These are short dramas airs on VTV1 & VTV3 during Tet Holiday.

VTV1 Weeknight Prime-time dramas

Monday-Wednesday dramas
These dramas air from 20:35 to 21:30, Monday to Wednesday on VTV1.

Thursday-Friday dramas
These dramas air from 20:35 to 21:30, Thursday and Friday on VTV1.

VTV3 Weeknight Prime-time dramas

Monday-Tuesday dramas
These dramas air from 21:30 to 22:20, Monday and Tuesday on VTV3.

Starting in April 2014, the time slot "Monday to Wednesday" was changed to "Monday and Tuesday".

Wednesday–Thursday dramas
These dramas air from 21:30 to 22:20, Wednesday and Thursday on VTV3.

Starting in April 2014, the time slot "Thursday and Friday" was changed to "Wednesday and Thursday".

Friday dramas
New time slot was opened in April 2014 but closed after 1 series.

This drama air from 21:25 to 23:00, Friday on VTV3.

VTV3 Rubic 8 dramas
These dramas air from 15:00 to 15:50, Saturday and Sunday on VTV3 as a part of the program Rubic 8.

VTV6 Weeknight Late-time dramas
These dramas air from 22:00 to 22:30, Monday to Friday on VTV6.

The time slot was paused during the time of 2014 FIFA World Cup. It was closed and not opened again after 2014 AFF Suzuki Cup.

See also
 List of dramas broadcast by Vietnam Television (VTV)
 List of dramas broadcast by Hanoi Radio Television (HanoiTV)
 List of dramas broadcast by Vietnam Digital Television (VTC)
List of television programmes broadcast by Vietnam Television (VTV)

References

External links
VTV.gov.vn – Official VTV Website 
VTV.vn – Official VTV Online Newspaper 

Vietnam Television original programming
2014 in Vietnamese television